Backyard Beats is a Canadian children's television series, which premiered on TVOntario in 2020. Hosted by Monica Brighton, the series profiles do it yourself approaches to making music, through a format which sees a professional musician visit to teach her about a musical genre or instrument, following which she makes her own version of the instrument with everyday household objects before the professional musician returns for a jam session on a song.

The series received a Canadian Screen Award nomination for Best Children's or Youth Non-Fiction Program or Series at the 9th Canadian Screen Awards in 2021.

References

External links

2020 Canadian television series debuts
2020s Canadian children's television series
2020s Canadian music television series
TVO original programming
Canadian children's musical television series